The Chief of the Joint Defence Staff (JEMACON) is a high-ranking military officer. The JEMACON is the closest assistant and advisor to the Chief of the Defence Staff and it is appointed by the Monarch at the request of the Minister of Defence.

To carry out its duties of assistance and advise, the JEMACON leds the Joint Defence Staff (EMACON), a military body integrated in the Defence Staff and formed by all the military personnel necessary to support the JEMAD in its duties.

The office of Chief of the Joint Defence Staff was created in 1984 along with the Chief of the Defence Staff position. Since 5 August 2020, the current and 18th JEMACON is Lieutenant general Fernando García González-Valerio.

Joint Defence Staff 
The JEMACON leads the Joint Defence Staff, the main advisory and assistance body to the Chief of the Defence Staff. The EMACON is integrated by:

 The Office of the Chief of the Joint Defence Staff. The Office is formed by the Chief of the Joint Defence Staff and its support personnel.
 The General Secretariat of the Joint Defence Staff (SEGEMACON). The SEGEMACON is the body responsible for assisting the JEMACON in the direction of the EMACON, as well as giving technical-administrative support to all the bodies of the Defence Staff. Likewise, it is responsible for all the advisory and support duties that are not responsibility of the EMACON's divisions.
 The Plans Division (DIVPLA). The DIVPLA is responsible for elaborating and coordinating the Armed Forces planning, developing all the duties related to the obtaining of material resources to the JEMAD and to guiding the transformation of the operative capabilities of the Armed Forces. Likewise, it is responsible for elaborating and coordinating the Armed Forces actiong before the international organizations for security and defence.
 The Strategy Division (DIVESTRA). The DIVESTRA is responsible for elaborating and coordinating the military strategy and the use of the Armed Forces. Likewise, it is responsible for elaborating and coordinating the action of the Armed Forces before the international organizations for security and defence in which the JEMAD has the responsibilities for planning and monitoring the derived actitivites of the bilateral and multi-lateral military relations. It also assists the JEMAD in the planning and strategic direction of the military operations.

List of Chiefs

References

Military of Spain
1984 establishments in Spain